The Lega Pallavolo Serie A is structured in several levels of importance; the highest of them is SuperLega (formerly Serie A1). Since the early 1980s, many among the best volleyball players in the world play in Superlega and the overall level of competition is considerably high. Nowadays, the SuperLega is widely considered the best league in the world.

Structure
As of 2016–17 season, the Italian volleyball championships are parted in this way:

SuperLega (highest level, 12 teams);
Serie A2 (second level, 14 teams);
Serie A3 (third level, 28 teams);
Serie B (fourth level, 14 teams in 9 rounds);
Serie C, organized by regional committees;
Serie D, organized by regional committees;
Prima Divisione, organized by provincial committees;
Seconda Divisione, organized by provincial committees;
Terza Divisione, organized by provincial committees.

SuperLega

SuperLega is the highest level club competition in Italian professional male volleyball. It is organized by Federazione Italiana Pallavolo (FIPAV) and Lega Pallavolo Serie A. It was known as Serie A between 1946 and 1977, then as Serie A1 until 2014.

Since 1982, the championship consists of two phases:

a round-robin tournament (regular season) which picks out the clubs admitted to the second phase and the teams destined to relegation;
a playoff tournament, which assigned the trophy.

Just in few occasions relegation playouts were disputed.

History
Volleyball made its first appearance in Italy after the end of World War I. In 1929 a Federazione Italiana Palla a Volo (FIPV) was founded. During the 1930s several  tournaments were organized by youth or workers movements within fascist associations like GIL and OND.

After the end of World War II and the overthrow of fascist regime, a new association, called Federazione Italiana Pallavolo, were founded in 1946. Later that year the city of Genoa hosted the first official male championship.

Quickly volleyball became popular in northern regions like Piedmont, Lombardy and especially Emilia-Romagna and Tuscany: clubs based on Ravenna, Modena, Parma, Bologna and Florence regularly won all the championships for more than thirty years. By the 1970s outsider clubs from centre-south cities (Rome, Catania) were more competitive.

In the 1980s the growth of Italy men's national volleyball team led volleyball to a peak of a popularity. After a period in which Turin's CUS and Parma's Santal dominated, great entrepreneurial companies (like Fininvest in Milan, Montedison in Ravenna and Benetton in Treviso) decided to support and invest in volleyball, equipping strong teams which often won European and Intercontinental trophies. 
During the 1990s and 2000s decades, Serie A1 was by far the best volleyball league in the world, due to the simultaneous presence of all Italian's golden generation members and even all the best foreign players from all over the world (Netherlands, Brazil, Cuba, Russia etc.). All along 1990s, Italian teams dominated all European club competitions and Serie A1 was called "the NBA of volleyball".

Situation
Today Serie A1 is called SuperLega and it's still one of the most difficult and competitive leagues in the world. Italian volleyball is diffused all over the country but, as a consequence of the enormous popularity of other disciplines (football above all) in big cities, it finds its highest popularity in medium-to-large cities.

Champions

1936–1941 (OND tournaments)

These tournaments were organized by the National Recreational Club (Opera Nazionale Dopolavoro).

1936: Azogeno Vado Ligure
1937: Azogeno Vado Ligure
1938: Torti Alessandria
1939: Azogeno Vado Ligure
1940: not held
1941: Lanerossi Schio

1946–today (FIPAV tournaments)

Teams
The following teams compete in the SuperLega during 2022–23 season:

Serie A2 
Serie A2 is the second highest level club competition in Italian professional male volleyball. It is organized by Federazione Italiana Pallavolo (FIPAV) and Lega Pallavolo Serie A. It was created in 1977 by splitting the previous Serie A in two tiers (Serie A1 and Serie A2).

Sponsor
 1989–91: Wuber Salumi
 1991–95: Acqua Boario
 1995–97: Kraft
 1997–99: La Trentina
 1999-03: LG Electronics
 2003–10: TIM
 2010–12: Sustenium Plus
 2012–13: Linkem 
 2013–14: UnipolSai 
 2013–: UnipolSai – Del Monte – Mikasa
 2021–: Credem Banca – Del Monte – Mikasa – Italtelo

See also
 Italian Volleyball Supercup
 Best Player in Serie A1

References

Sources
Almanacco Illustrato del Volley – 1987, Panini Edizioni, Modena, 1986

External links 
 Official website 
 Lega Pallavolo Serie A 
 Italian Volleyball Federation (FIPAV) 

 

Men's volleyball competitions in Italy
Italy
1946 establishments in Italy
Sports leagues established in 1946
Volley
Volleyball
pt:Liga Italiana de Voleibol Masculino